Ik Tara, also spelled as Iktara or sometimes Ektara', was the first LP record of Kuldeep Manak released by HMV in 1976. It was released after about one year of recording as the record manager of HMV, Zaheer Ahmad, delayed its release as he was frightened the record would not do well in the market.

Music 

Kesar Singh Narula composed the music and the lyricists mainly includes Dev Tharike Wala (also known as Hardev Dilgir).

Track list 

The songs are:

Tere Tille Ton (Kali)
Chheti Kar Sarwan Bachcha
Chithian Sahiban Jatti Ne
Mere Yaar Nu Manda Na Bolin
Kaulan
Garh Mughlane Dian Naaran

Response 

The record was a huge success specially the kali, Tere Tille Ton, established Manak as Kalian Da Badshah (English: King of Kalis) although he sang only about 13 kalis in his career.

See also 
Teri Khatar Heere
Tere Tille Ton

References 

Punjabi albums
Punjabi music
Kuldeep Manak albums